The 84th season of the Campeonato Gaúcho kicked off on February 1, 2004 and ended on June 6, 2004. Eighteen teams participated. Holders Internacional beat Ulbra in the finals, winning their 36th title. Santo Ângelo and Pelotas were relegated.

Participating teams

System 
The championship would have four stages:

 Group A: The four teams in the Série A and Série B (Internacional, Grêmio, Caxias and Juventude) and the four best teams in the previous year's championship were divided into two groups of four, with the teams in each group playing twice against the teams of the other group; the two best teams in each group qualified into the Group Semifinals, played in two matches, with the winners qualifying into the Championship Semifinals and to the Group Finals, played in one match.
 Group B: The fourteen teams that didn't participate in the Série A or Série B played against each other in a double round-robin system. After 26 rounds, the two best teams in each group qualified to the Semifinals. and the bottom two teams were relegated.
 Semifinals: The four remaining teams played in a single knockout match to define the teams that would qualify to the Finals.
 Finals: Semifinals group winners played in two matches to define the Champions. The team with best overall record played the second leg at home.

Championship

Group A

Chave A

Chave B

Semifinals

Finals

Group B

Semifinals

Finals

References 

Campeonato Gaúcho seasons
Gaúcho